Corymbia erythrophloia, commonly known as the red bloodwood, variable-barked bloodwood, red-barked bloodwood or gum-topped bloodwood, is a species of tree that is endemic to Queensland. It has rough bark on the trunk and branches, egg-shaped or lance-shaped adult leaves, flower buds in groups of seven, creamy white flowers and urn-shaped to spherical fruit.

Description
The bark sheds in small polygonal flakes giving the tree a mottled appearance.

The tree will bloom between January to April and the flowers are creamy white. The seeds are boat-shaped or oval and reddish brown with a wing on the end.

Taxonomy and naming
The first formal description of this species was by William Blakely in 1934 who published the description in his book A Key to the Eucalypts and gave it the name Eucalyptus erythrophloia. The type specimens were collected by Thomas Lane Bancroft (1860–1933) near Eidsvold in 1919. In 1995, botanists Ken Hill and Lawrie Johnson defined the genus Corymbia, identifying the bloodwoods, ghost gums and spotted gums as a group distinct from Eucalyptus and they changed the name Eucalyptus erythrophloia to Corymbia erythrophloia.

Distribution and habitat
Corymbia erythrophloia is found down the east coast of Queensland as far north as Queenstown on the Cape York Peninsula where it is found as far west as the Gulf of Carpentaria. The range then extends as far south as the Hervey Bay with an isolated population found further south to the west of Brisbane. It is found on grassy woodlands or low rolling hills containing clayey or stony soils mostly of volcanic origin. It is often found in association with mountain coolibah or the silver-leaved ironbark.

Conservation status
This eucalypt is classified as of "least concern" under the Queensland Government Nature Conservation Act 1992.

Use in horticulture
The tree can be grown as a shade tree that is a bird attractor in gardens where it can tolerate a hot overhead sun and dry soils. Soils can be ordinary or enriched, containing clay and mildly acidic to mildly alkaline. Trees are pruned to retain one main trunk sometimes are allowed multiple trunks which are well-spaced to develop.

See also
 List of Corymbia species

References

erythrophloia
Myrtales of Australia
Flora of Queensland
Plants described in 1934